Pierre Abraham, (1 March 1892 – 20 May 1974 in Paris) was a French journalist, essayist and military figure in the French Air Force during the world wars.

Biography 
A graduate of the Ecole Polytechnique, he served during World War I from 1914 to 1918 as an aviator officer. After the war, his brother Jean-Richard Bloch encouraged him to write and he entered various literary circles. He began with criticism in newspapers and magazines. He worked on the magazine Europe since the magazine was founded and published several essays, and was noticed for his originality. In 1935, he led a research team in compiling the French Encyclopedia.

During World War II, he participated in the Resistance and Liberation of Nice where he became city councilor from 1947 to 1959. As Lieutenant-Colonel of the Reserve Air Force, he was appointed to the Executive Secretary of the Liberation of Allied Air Berlin.

From 1949 until his death in 1974, he functioned as the head editor of Europe. In the last years of his life, he directed the collective work of the Histoire littéraire de la France.

Works 
 Balzac, Rieder, 1929
 Figures, Gallimard, 1929
 Proust, Rieder, 1930
 Créatures chez Balzac, Gallimard, 1930
 Le physique au théâtre, Coutan-Lambert, 1933
 Une figure, deux visages, 1934
 Tiens bon la rampe, roman, 1951
 Les trois frères, Editeurs Français Réunis, 1971
 Freud, Editeurs Français Réunis, 1974

1892 births
1974 deaths
Writers from Paris
French biographers
20th-century French journalists
École Polytechnique alumni
20th-century French male writers
French World War I pilots
French Resistance members
20th-century French essayists
French male non-fiction writers